The 1990 Arab Junior Athletics Championships was the fourth edition of the international athletics competition for under-20 athletes from Arab countries. It took place in Latakia, Syria. Only women competed at this edition of the competition in a programme containing only 18 athletics events. International participation was very limited, with Egypt and Syria providing all but three of the medallists. Palestine was the only other competing nation.

Egypt topped the medal table with ten gold medals, followed by the hosts Syria with six golds. Palestine's sole individual medals came in the 5000 m walk, in which its two athletes were the only finishers. Sisters Rania Mohamed Ali and Ridha Mohamed Ali each won three gold medals in the track events for Egypt. Their compatriot Shirin Mohamed Kheiri El Atrabi became the third woman to complete a 100 metres hurdles and heptathlon double, following in the footsteps of Huda Hashem Ismail and Yasmina Azzizi. Reflecting the diminished participation, the marks set at this competition were of a much lower standard than in previous years.

Medal summary

Medal table

References

Arab Junior Athletics Championships
International athletics competitions hosted by Syria
Sport in Latakia
Arab Junior Athletics Championships
Arab Junior Athletics Championships
1990 in youth sport